(born August 10, 1975 in Yokohama, Japan) is a Japanese actress.

Filmography
 Twilight Syndrome: The Digital Movie (2000)
 Heisei kinyū dō: Maruhi no onna (1999)
 Kyōhan (1999)
 Zero Woman: Abunai yūgi (1998 aka Zero Woman: Dangerous Game) - Rei
 Metropolitan Police Branch 82 (1998) - Mika
 Eko Eko Azaraku: The Series (1997) TV series - Kaoru Okamoto
 Eko eko azaraku II (1996) - Shoko Takanashi
 Sakura no sono (1990) - Kumi Takano

External links

1975 births
Living people
Japanese actresses
Japanese female adult models
People from Yokohama